Contagem is a city in the center of the state of Minas Gerais, in Brazil. It is only  from the capital, Belo Horizonte, and forms part of a metropolitan area with a population of 4.8 million.

Geography

Demography
According to estimates from 2020 the municipal population was 668,949 making it the third most populous city in the state of Minas Gerais, after Belo Horizonte and Uberlândia.

The population is very young with 86% of the population being less than 50 years old.

Education indicators:
adults with up to 10 years of education: 23.67%
young people between 10 and 14 years old attending school: 96.8%
adults with no formal schooling: 5.21%
young people ages between 15 and 17 enrolled in secondary education:   83.7%
adults who have studied some university: 23%
illiteracy rate for adults over 25: 7%

Source: Census 2010

Economy
Contagem is primarily a city of heavy industry with a diversified industrial complex; even though minerals processing and chemicals still have a large importance. The municipality is responsible for 5.28% of the state GDP, occupying third place after Belo Horizonte and Betim.

Serious problems with water and air pollution exist, and the Pampulha Lake (Belo Horizonte) receives large quantities of heavy metals from the city.

Contagem was the first industrial district built in Minas Gerais. Inaugurated in 1946, by 1950 it was the largest in the state. The Gafanhoto power plant (on the Pará River) was built by the state government in 1952 to provide for the implementation and development of the district, which is still the largest industrial region in Minas Gerais.

Ceasa Minas Greater BH (regional wholesale supply center) is in Contagem. It has a built area of 605,000m2, with 535 companies installed, and a public on busy days of 65,000 people. It is the largest in vegetables in all of Brazil.

Sister city 
 Cienfuegos

Carmelo is a sister city in Cuba.

Notable people 

 Gilson Bernardo (born 1968), volleyball player
 Arlene Xavier (born 1969), volleyball player
 Ramon Menezes (born 1972), footballer
 Glaydson (born 1979), defensive midfielder
 Erika Januza (born 1985), actress and model
 Serginho (born 1986), footballer
 Philipe Fidélis dos Santos (born 1989), footballer
 Jonathan Reis (born 1990), footballer
 Raquel Fernandes (born 1991), footballer
 Ricardo Lucarelli (born 1992), volleyball player
 Graxa (born 1993), footballer
 Kay (born 1999), 2-time UR2D Sunday League World Champion

References

External links

Ceasa Greater BH
City government official site

Municipalities in Minas Gerais